Channing Nicole Dungey (born March 14, 1969) is an American television executive and the first black American president of a major broadcast television network. In 2020, she was announced as the new chairwoman and CEO of Warner Bros. Television Studios.

Early life
Dungey was born in Sacramento, California, to Don and Judith Dungey. She is the oldest of two daughters; her younger sister is actress Merrin Dungey. Dungey attended Rio Americano High School where she was a cheerleader and held a 2.4 GPA. She graduated in 1986. In 1991, Dungey graduated from the UCLA School of Theater, Film and Television.

Career
Dungey began her career in entertainment as a development assistant for producers J. Todd Harris and Joseph M. Singer. She later joined Warner Bros. as a production assistant, where she helped develop and supervise a number of commercially successful films including The Bridges of Madison County (1995), Heat (1995), The Matrix (1999), and The Devil's Advocate (1997). Dungey joined ABC Studios in the summer of 2004 and worked as head of drama.  Dungey was hired as president of ABC Entertainment on February 17, 2016, replacing Paul Lee. This appointment made her the first Black executive to run a major network's entertainment division. Dungey oversaw the development of ABC Studios shows such as Scandal, Criminal Minds, How to Get Away with Murder, Nashville, Quantico, Army Wives, and Once Upon a Time. She was president of the division during the second cancellation of Roseanne on May 29, 2018. Dungey previously defended Roseanne over racially controversial jokes made on the show. She was ABC Entertainment's president when a Black-ish episode was pulled from the schedule. Dungey noted ABC executives disagreed with the creative direction of the episode, wherein the writers touched on NFL players kneeling during the American national anthem to protest police brutality and show support for Black human rights.

On November 16, 2018, Dungey left her role as President of the ABC Entertainment Group in advance of management changes triggered by Disney's takeover of 21st Century Fox.  Karey Burke, head of original programming for Disney's Freeform cable channel, took Dungey's position as head of ABC Entertainment.  On December 17, 2018, it was reported that Netflix had hired Dungey as their new vice president of original content.  While at Netflix Dungey reported to Cindy Holland, Netflix's vice president of original content. She worked with fellow ABC alums Shonda Rhimes and Kenya Barris at Netflix. She left Netflix in October 2020.

On October 19, 2020, it was announced that Dungey would succeed Peter Roth in the position of chairwoman of Warner Bros. Television Group, reporting to Ann Sarnoff. This role makes her one of few Black executives in a Hollywood television studio.

On May 4, 2021, the Chicago Red Stars of the National Women's Soccer League announced that Dungey and her spouse Scott Power had joined the women's soccer team's ownership group.

Personal life
Married to Scott Power since 2003, Dungey serves on the Motion Picture & Television Fund (MPTF) Board of Governors.

References

External links

1969 births
Living people
African-American businesspeople
American television executives
Businesspeople from Sacramento, California
Presidents of American Broadcasting Company Entertainment
Chicago Red Stars owners